The International Pollutants Elimination Network (IPEN) (formerly International POPs Elimination Network) is a global network of NGOs dedicated to the common aim of eliminating pollutants, such as lead in paint, mercury and lead in the environment, persistent organic pollutants (POPs), endocrine disrupting chemicals, and other toxics.

IPEN is composed of public interest non-governmental organizations who support a common platform for the global elimination of POPs via the Stockholm Convention, work to influence the implementation of the Rotterdam and Basel conventions, as well as the Minimata Convention on Mercury.

IPEN's more than 550 public interest non-governmental organizations in over 120 countries work together for the elimination of toxic pollutants, on an expedited yet socially equitable basis. This mission includes achieving a world in which all chemicals are produced and used in ways that eliminate significant adverse effects on human health and the environment, and where persistent organic pollutants (POPs) and chemicals of equivalent concern no longer pollute local and global environments.

See also 
 Center for International Environmental Law (CIEL)
 POP Air Pollution Protocol
 Stockholm Convention
 Minamata Convention on Mercury
 Basel Convention
 Rotterdam Convention

Notes

External links
 IPEN Official Website

International environmental organizations
Biodegradable waste management